A cover-up is an attempt, whether successful or not, to conceal evidence of wrongdoing, error, incompetence, or other embarrassing information. Research has distinguished personal cover-ups (covering up one's own misdeeds) from relational cover-ups (covering up someone else's misdeeds).

The expression is usually applied to people in positions of authority who abuse power to avoid or silence criticism or to deflect guilt of wrongdoing. Perpetrators of a cover-up (initiators or their allies) may be responsible for a misdeed, a breach of trust or duty, or a crime.

While the terms are often used interchangeably, cover-up involves withholding incriminatory evidence, while whitewash involves releasing misleading evidence.  See also Misprision.

A cover-up involving multiple parties is a type of conspiracy.

Modern usage

When a scandal breaks, the discovery of an attempt to cover up the truth is often regarded as even more reprehensible than the original deeds.

The mildest case, not quite a cover-up, is simply to release news which could be embarrassing but is not important enough to guarantee attention, at a time when other news is dominating the headlines, or immediately before a holiday or weekend.

Initially a cover-up may require little effort; it will be carried out by those closely involved with the misdeed. Once some hint of the hidden matter starts to become known, the cover-up gradually draws all the top leadership, at least, of an organization into complicity in covering up a misdeed or even crime that may have originally been committed by a few of its members acting independently. This may be regarded as tacit approval of that behaviour.

It is likely that some cover-ups are successful, although by definition this cannot be confirmed. Many fail, however, as more and more people are drawn in and the possibility of exposure makes potential accomplices fearful of supporting the cover-up and as loose ends that may never normally have been noticed start to stand out. As it spreads, the cover-up itself creates yet more suspicious circumstances.

The original misdeed being covered may be relatively minor, such as the "third-rate burglary" which started the Watergate scandal, but the cover-up adds so many additional crimes (obstruction of justice, perjury, payoffs and bribes, in some cases suspicious suicides or outright murder) that the cover-up becomes much more serious than the original crime. This gave rise to the phrase, "it's not the crime, it's the cover-up".

Cover-ups do not necessarily require the active manipulation of facts or circumstances. Arguably the most common form of cover-up is one of non-action. It is the conscious failure to release incriminating information by a third party. This "passive cover-up" is often justified by the motive of not wanting to embarrass the culprit or expose them to criminal prosecution or even the belief that the cover-up is justified by protecting the greater community from scandal. Yet, because of the passive cover-up, the misdeed often goes undiscovered and results in harm to others ensuing from its failure to be discovered. 
Real cover-ups are common enough, but any event which is not completely clear is likely to give rise to a thicket of conspiracy theories alleging covering up of sometimes the weirdest and most unlikely conspiracies.

"Snowjob" is an American and Canadian colloquialism for a deception or a cover-up; for example, Helen Gahagan Douglas described the Nixon Administration as "the greatest snow job in history".

Typology

The following list is considered to be a typology since those who engage in cover-ups tend to use many of the same methods of hiding the truth and defending themselves. This list was compiled from famous cover-ups such as Watergate Scandal, Iran-Contra Affair, My Lai Massacre, Pentagon Papers, the cover-up of corruption in New York City under Boss Tweed (William M. Tweed and Tammany Hall) in the late 1800s, and the tobacco industry cover-up of the health hazards of smoking.  The methods in actual cover-ups tend to follow the general order of the list below.

 Initial response to allegation

 Flat denial
 Convince the media to bury the story
 Preemptively distribute false information
 Claim that the "problem" is minimal
 Claim faulty memory
 Claim the accusations are half-truths
 Claim the critic has no proof
 Attack the critic's motive
 Attack the critic's character

 Withhold or tamper with evidence

 Prevent the discovery of evidence
 Destroy or alter the evidence
 Make discovery of evidence difficult
 Create misleading names of individuals and companies to hide funding
 Lie or commit perjury
 Block or delay investigations
 Issue restraining orders
 Claim executive privilege

 Delayed response to allegation

 Deny a restricted definition of wrongdoing (e.g. torture)
 Limited hang out(i.e., confess to minor charges)
 Use biased evidence as a defense
 Claim that the critic's evidence is biased
 Select a biased blue ribbon commission or "independent" inquiry

 Intimidate participants, witnesses or whistleblowers
 Bribe or buy out the critic
 Generally intimidate the critic by following him or her, killing pets, etc.
 Blackmail: hire private investigators and threaten to reveal past wrongdoing ("dirt")
 Death threats of the critic or his or her family
 Threaten the critic with loss of job or future employment in industry
 Transfer the critic to an inferior job or location
 Intimidate the critic with lawsuits or SLAPP suits
 Murder; assassination

 Publicity management

 Bribe the press
 Secretly plant stories in the press
 Retaliate against hostile media
 Threaten the press with loss of access
 Attack the motives of the press
 Place defensive advertisements
 Buy out the news source

 Damage control

 Claim no knowledge of wrongdoing
 Scapegoats: blame an underling for unauthorized action
 Fire the person(s) in charge

 Win court cases

 Hire the best lawyers
 Hire scientists and expert witnesses who will support your story
 Delay with legal maneuvers
 Influence or control the judges

 Reward cover-up participants

 Hush money
 Little or no punishment
 Pardon or commute sentences
 Promote employees as a reward for cover-up
 Reemploy the employee after dust clears

In criminal law 
Depending on the nature of cover-up activities, they may constitute a crime in certain jurisdictions. Perjury is considered a crime in virtually all legal systems. Likewise, obstruction of justice, that is, any activity that aims to cover-up another crime, is itself a crime in many legal systems. The United States has the crime of making false statements to a federal agent in the context of any matter within the federal jurisdiction, which includes not only providing misleading statements but also the withholding of information.

Examples 

 The Dreyfus Affair
 Armenian genocide denial
 Katyn massacre
 The Iran–Contra affair
 The Luzhniki disaster
 The My Lai Massacre
 The Roman Catholic sex abuse cases of the late 20th and early 21st centuries.
 The Watergate scandal
 Russian doping scandals

Alleged cover-ups 
Conspiracy theories generally include an allegation of a cover-up of the facts of some prominent event. Examples include:

 John F. Kennedy assassination
 TWA Flight 800 conspiracy theories 
 Korean Air Lines Flight 007 alternate theories
 M/S Estonia
 New World Order
 Pusztai affair
 Roswell incident
 September 11, 2001 terrorist attacks
 Attack on the U.S. diplomatic mission in Benghazi
 UFOs in general
 Mamasapano clash
Death of Jeffrey Epstein
COVID-19 pandemic
2023 Ohio train derailment

See also

References

External links

 
Censorship
Conspiracies
Deception
Scandals
Perception